Ernst Plener (21 February 1919 – 16 March 2007) was a German international footballer who played for Vorwärts Gleiwitz and HSV Groß Born.

References

External links

1919 births
2007 deaths
Association football forwards
German footballers
Germany international footballers
People from Katowice
People from the Province of Upper Silesia